Gary M. Vanek (August 12, 1940September 5, 2017) was a Michigan politician.

Early life
Vanek was born on August 12, 1940.

Education
Vanek graduated from Central Michigan University and Eastern Michigan University.

Career
Vanek served on the Michigan Liquor Control Commission. On July 11, 1978, Vanek was elected to the Michigan House of Representatives where he represented the 66th district from July 12, 1978 to 1982.

Death
Vanek died on September 5, 2017.

References

1940 births
2017 deaths
Democratic Party members of the Michigan House of Representatives
Central Michigan University alumni
Eastern Michigan University alumni
20th-century American politicians